A tollbooth is a place where tolls for road usage are collected on toll roads.

Tollbooth may also refer to:

Places 
 Tollbooth Gallery, Tacoma, Washington, United States

Films 
 Tollbooth (film), a 1994 film directed by Salomé Breziner
 The Tollbooth, a 2004 coming-of-age film
 Toll Booth (film), a 2010 Turkish drama film

Other uses
 Tollbooth (G.I. Joe), a fictional character in the G.I. Joe universe

See also 
 Tolbooth (disambiguation)
 Phantom Tollbooth (disambiguation)
 Toll house (disambiguation)
 Toll station (disambiguation)
 Toll houses of the United Kingdom